Veldre Church is a parish church of the Church of Norway in Ringsaker Municipality in Innlandet county, Norway. It is located in the village of Byflaten. It is one of the churches for the Bromunddal/Veldre parish which is part of the Ringsaker prosti (deanery) in the Diocese of Hamar. The white, wooden church was built in a long church design in 2000 using plans drawn up by the architects Ulf Zettersten and Roar Jacobsen. The church seats about 275 people.

History
The earliest existing historical records of the church date back to the year 1332, but the church was not new that year. The first church here was a wooden stave church that was probably built during the 13th century. This church was probably located at Flisaker, a short distance to the southeast of the present site of the church. Around the year 1615, a new church porch and sacristy were added to the building. After an inspection in 1665, the church was found to be too small and in poor condition, so it was repaired and expanded around that time. A new pulpit and baptismal font were also added at that time.

By the early 1700s, the church was deemed to be in such poor condition that it needed to be replaced. Knud Bergoust was hired to build the new church in the central part of the present day graveyard. Construction of the new half-timbered cruciform church took place in 1725–1726. It had a sacristy on the north side of the choir and a tower in the center of the nave roof. The new building was consecrated on 29 September 1726 (Michaelmas) by the Bishop Bartholomæus Deichman. This church seated about 400 people. (The old church at Flisaker was not torn down until 1776.) In 1755, the church received exterior siding. In 1867, a new, taller tower was built. In 1914, the nave was expanded by adding  to the west end to accommodate a new organ. In 1969, the sacristy was expanded. On 28 September 1996, the church burned down, possibly due to an electrical problem. A lot of the historical artwork and furniture was lost in the fire.

Planning for a new church began soon after the old church and rubble was cleared. Ulf Zettersten, from Nyköping, Sweden and Roar Jacobsen from Gjøvik, Norway were hired to design the new church. The new, large wooden long church was designed to look like historical churches, but it has many modern characteristics as well. It also has a small 30-seat octagonal chapel near the main entrance. The new building was consecrated on 19 March 2000 by the Bishop Rosemarie Köhn.

Media gallery

See also
List of churches in Hamar

References

Churches in Ringsaker
Churches in Innlandet
Long churches in Norway
Wooden churches in Norway
20th-century Church of Norway church buildings
Churches completed in 2000
13th-century establishments in Norway